IBSF World Championship may refer to:

IBSF World Snooker Championship
IBSF World Championships (bobsleigh and skeleton)